Konstantin Chistyakov (born 19 March 1970) is a Russian former alpine skier who competed in the 1988 Winter Olympics and 1992 Winter Olympics.

External links
 sports-reference.com

1970 births
Living people
Russian male alpine skiers
Soviet male alpine skiers
Olympic alpine skiers of the Soviet Union
Olympic alpine skiers of the Unified Team
Alpine skiers at the 1988 Winter Olympics
Alpine skiers at the 1992 Winter Olympics